Błotno may refer to the following places:
Błotno, Lubusz Voivodeship (west Poland)
Błotno, Goleniów County in West Pomeranian Voivodeship (north-west Poland)
Błotno, Stargard County in West Pomeranian Voivodeship (north-west Poland)